Keeper of the Seven Keys: Part II is the third studio album by German power metal band Helloween, released in 1988. The album sold well, and success bloomed all over Europe, Asia, and even the United States. The album went gold in Germany and reached No. 108 in the US.

Two singles were released from the album, "Dr. Stein" and "I Want Out". "Dr. Stein" has a very long and moody solo, played with a blues tinge, very unlike other solos on the album, as well as an organ solo. "I Want Out" remains the band's best-known song, and has been covered by several metal bands, such as Gamma Ray (which Kai Hansen formed after leaving Helloween itself), Unisonic, HammerFall, LORD and Sonata Arctica. It is their last album to feature Hansen until 2021's self-titled album.

Background 
The recording of the album actually lasted for 24 hours a day. Tommy Newton would work during the daytime and Tommy Hansen took over at night. That went on (between May and June 1988), until eventually Tommy Hansen got fired from the project by Karl Walterbach (Noise Records' boss). Newton wanted to continue on his own, so after Tommy Hansens preview mix of 'Eagle Fly Free' he was sent home. Newton had claimed that if he mixed it on his own he could make it sound far more modern.

Critical reception

Loudwire named the album at first in their list "Top 25 Power Metal Albums of All Time." The album also ranked in the list "The 10 essential power metal albums" by Metal Hammer and topped their 2019 list of "25 Greatest power metal albums".

Track listing
All songs written by Michael Weikath, except where noted.

Tracks 1 and 2 also appear on the "Dr. Stein" single
Track 3 also appears on the "I Want Out" single
Tracks 4 and 5 also appear on the Treasure Chest compilation

Personnel

Helloween
Michael Kiske - vocals
Kai Hansen - guitar, backing vocals
Michael Weikath - guitar, keyboards, backing vocals, cover concept
Markus Grosskopf - bass, fretless bass on "Eagle Fly Free"
Ingo Schwichtenberg - drums

Production
Tommy Newton - engineer, mixing for "I Got Confused Productions"
Tommy Hansen - engineer, mixing of "Invitation"

Charts

Weekly

Year-end

Certifications

References

1988 albums
Helloween albums
Noise Records albums
Sequel albums